Bensham Manor is a ward in the London Borough of Croydon, covering part of the Thornton Heath area of London in the United Kingdom. The ward extends from Thornton Heath railway station westwards and is largely residential with a retail or industrial core. The population of the Ward at the 2011 Census was 16,201.

The ward currently forms part of Steve Reed MP's Croydon North constituency.

The ward returns three councillors every four years to Croydon Council. At the 2006 Croydon Council election, Raj Rajendran, Paula Shaw, and Greta Sohoye were elected to the council. All of them were running as Labour Party candidates. Councillor Shaw resigned in 2007 triggering a by-election on 18 February 2007 which was won by Labour's Alison Butler.

List of Councillors

Mayoral election results 
Below are the results for the candidate which received the highest share of the popular vote in the ward at each mayoral election.

Ward Result

References

External links
Croydon Council Bensham Manor Ward Profile 
Metropolitan Police Crime Mapping
Safer Neighbourhoods Team Priorities
Council Elections 2006 results - Bensham Manor
Labour Councillors for Croydon.
 London Borough of Croydon map of wards.

Wards of the London Borough of Croydon